STTR may refer to:
 Small Business Technology Transfer Program, a United States Government program, similar to the Small Business Innovation Research program
 Speech-to-text reporter
 Space Test and Training Range
 Société de transport de Trois-Rivières, a transit company in Trois-Rivières, Quebec, Canada